= Brandenburg-Southwest =

Brandenburg-Southwest Brandenburg-Südwest
- Region
- Country: Germany

Area
  - Total: 13,978.7 km^{2} (5,397.2 sq mi)

Population (2007)
  - Total: 1,391,100
  - Density: 99.516/km^{2} (257.74/sq mi)
- NUTS code: DE42
- GDP per capita (PPS): € 20,100 (2006)

Brandenburg-Southwest was a NUTS-2 Regions of Germany, which encompassed the southwestern portion of the state of Brandenburg, until it was merged with Brandenburg-Northeast in 2009
