= Brandenburg-Northeast =

Brandenburg-Northeast Brandenburg-Nordost
- Region
- Country: Germany

Area
  - Total: 15,498 km^{2} (5,984 sq mi)

Population (2007)
  - Total: 1,150,700
  - Density: 74.248/km^{2} (192.30/sq mi)
- NUTS code: DE41
- GDP per capita (PPS): € 17,800 (2006)

Brandenburg-Northeast was a NUTS-2 Regions of Germany, which encompassed the northeastern portion of the state of Brandenburg, until it was merged with Brandenburg-Südwest in 2009
